Evandale may refer to:

Evandale, New Brunswick
Evandale, South Australia
Evandale, Tasmania

See also
Avondale, South Lanarkshire (archaically known as Evandale)